Women's Slalom World Cup 1968/1969

Final point standings

In Women's Slalom World Cup 1968/69 the best 3 results count. Deductions are given in brackets.

References
 fis-ski.com

Women's Slalom
FIS Alpine Ski World Cup slalom women's discipline titles